Matthias Trattnig (born April 22, 1979) is an Austrian former professional ice hockey defenceman. He was selected by the Chicago Blackhawks in the 4th round (94th overall) of the 1998 NHL Entry Draft and was a leader at the University of Maine. Trattnig most notably played as the longtime Captain of EC Red Bull Salzburg of the Austrian Hockey League.

Following his 14th season with EC Red Bull Salzburg in the 2018-19 season, Trattnig ended his 24-year professional career on 15 April 2019.

He was a veteran member of the Austria men's national ice hockey team, and last participated  at the 2011 IIHF World Championship. He also competed at the 2002 Winter Olympics and the 2014 Winter Olympics.

Awards and honours

Career statistics

Regular season and playoffs

International

References

External links

1979 births
Austrian ice hockey defencemen
Chicago Blackhawks draft picks
Djurgårdens IF Hockey players
EC Graz players
Living people
Ice hockey players at the 2002 Winter Olympics
Ice hockey players at the 2014 Winter Olympics
Olympic ice hockey players of Austria
Maine Black Bears men's ice hockey players
EC Red Bull Salzburg players
Sportspeople from Graz
NCAA men's ice hockey national champions